Elections to Greenwich Council were held in May 2002.  The whole council was up for election for the first time since the 1998 election.

Greenwich local elections are held every four years. The next election was in 2006.

Election result

|}

Ward results

References

2002
2002 London Borough council elections
May 2002 events in the United Kingdom